Aigaleo or Egaleo is a suburban municipality in the western part of Athens, belonging to the West Athens regional administrative unit. It takes its name from Mount Aigaleo. Its population was 69,946 at the 2011 census.

Geography 

It is southeast of Mount Aigaleo. The Cephissus river flows through the industrialized eastern part of the municipality; about 1/4 of its area is taken up by factory developments. The town is served by two Metro stations: Egaleo and Agia Marina metro stations. The Motorway 1 (Athens-Thessaloniki-Evzones) passes through the town.

Aigaleo consists of the quarters Kato Aigaleo, Neo Aigaleo, Damarakia, Lioumi, Rosika, Agios Spyridonas and Agios Georgios.

History 

Aigaleo was part of the municipality of Athens until 1934, when it became a separate community. It was raised to municipality status in 1943.

On September 29, 1944, during the Axis occupation of Greece, a massacre of at least 65 civilians (with estimates ranging up to 150 casualties) by the German forces took place in Aigaleo's Agios Georgios neighborhood.

Historical population

Sports 
Aigaleo hosts many sport teams. The most successful is the Athletic Club Egaleo with successful departments in football (Egaleo FC) and basketball (Egaleo BC). Other amateur clubs are A.P.O. Orfeas, A.E. Egaleo City, Diagoras Dryopideon, A.P.O. Ierapolis, A.O. Cronos

Mayors 
  (1934-1939, first president of the community "Nees Kydonies")
  (1939-1944)
  (1944-1945)
  (1945-1946)
  (1946)
  (1946–1950)
 Chr. Katharios (1950-1951)
  (1951–1954)
  (1955–1967, 1975–1978)
 Georgios Martinis (1959)
  (appointed by the military government, 1967–74)
  (1974-1975)
  (1979–1986, 1991–1994)
  (1987–1990, 1995–2002)
  (2003–2010)
  (2010 – 31 August 2014)
  (1 September 2014 – 31 August 2019)
  (1 September 2019 – present)

People 
 Rita Abatzi, Greek musician
 Keti Garbi, Greek singer
 Tassos Halkias, Greek actor
 Giorgos Zampetas, Greek musician
 Eleni Rantou, Greek actor
 Lakis Halkias, Greek musician
 Kostas Prekas, Greek actor
 Ioannes Dimaras, Greek politician and journalist
 Nasos Athanasiou, Greek journalist
 Giorgos Messalas, Greek actor
 Danis Katranidis, Greek actor
 Alexandros Asonitis, Greek writer
 Theofilos Verikios, Greek writer
 Giorgos Blanas, Greek writer
 Nikolaos Mihiotis, Greek writer
 Vicky Psarakis, Greek singer

International relations 
Aigaleo is twinned with:
  Leganés (Comunidad de Madrid), Spain
  Kythrea, Cyprus (under Turkish occupation, since August 1974)

References

Sources 
 "Τέχνης έργα και πρόσωπα του Αιγάλεω" (Published by the Municipality of Egaleo)
 "Εξήντα χρόνια τοπική αυτοδιοίκηση στο Αιγάλεω" (Nikolaos Mihiotis)
 "Απ' τις Νέες Κυδωνίες στο Δήμο Αιγάλεω" (Eugenia Bournova)

External links 

  Municipality of Aigaleo

Municipalities of Attica